Body suspension means the act of rigging a human body to hang from implements that have been placed through temporary perforations in the skin.

A number of health concerns might be associated with the practice, such as excessive bleeding, fainting, fall injuries, infections,

History 

Body suspension has historically been practiced by different cultures around the world. The Thaipusam festival, celebrated by the Tamil Hindu community on the full moon in the Tamil month of Thai (January/February), features body suspension. The Charak Puja, a Hindu folk festival in honour of the god Shiva, has also featured body suspensions for thousands of years.

In North America the Okipa ceremony - which includes piercing and suspension - has been a major part of Mandan religious life. This ceremony of the Plains Indians tribe first became known outside the tribe in 1832. This complex ceremony about the creation of the earth was glimpsed, and then aspects of it depicted for a non-Native public, by painter George Catlin. The piercing and suspension is only one part of the Okipa ceremony.

Modern-day suspensions, as performed by non-Natives, are influenced by the Modern Primitivism movement and based on imitations of Catlin's artwork  combined with the experimental creations of fellow performance artists. Artists involved in creating modern suspension experiences include Allen Falkner, who first introduced suspension as a secular activity; the researcher Stelarc, who performed suspensions in the 70s and 80s, including hanging himself between skyscrapers; and Fakir Musafar (Roland Loomis).

Method 
The process is very delicate and is typically done carefully by an experienced individual or professional of the field in order to avoid serious injury. Suspension may require and often has a small group who handle preparations and the process itself. The actual act of being suspended may take up a tiny portion of time compared to the time involved in preparation, though some people remain suspended for hours. 

The suspendee's body is studied to decide the proper placement, number, and size of metal hooks which are pierced into the skin to lift the person off the ground. Depending on the position in which the body is to be suspended, multiple hooks are sometimes located around the shoulders, upper arm, back, and the knees. Finding the proper hook placement and number involves basic geometry and an acute understanding of human anatomy and physiology, as well as the durability of the individual's skin. If the number of hooks are too few, the suspended individual's skin will be unable to withstand the body's weight and will rip. The amount of weight that each hook supports must be distributed evenly throughout the entire body.  

A block and tackle intended for rock climbing and rope that attaches to the hooks is used to slowly and carefully lift an individual a foot or two off the ground — where they may remain relatively motionless for a predetermined period of time. Some also choose to have more dynamic suspensions, where they swing or are pushed around the area.

Equipment

Rigging
There are two main types of rigging: dynamic and static. Dynamic rigging primarily uses ropes, or something similar, and one long piece is used to connect the suspender to the apparatus. In static rigging, each hook is attached to the apparatus separately.

The apparatus is usually rigged to a tree, ceiling, scaffolding, etc. using pulleys, a winch or a backhoe.

Types of suspensions

Chest
A chest suspension, sometimes incorrectly referred to as an "O-Kee-Pa", is a suspension in which the hook(s) are placed in the chest. Typically two hooks are used for this type of suspension. This was initially named after the Okipa ceremony of the Mandan people, and popularized under that name by Fakir Musafar. The modern, secular suspension performance, however, is not an accurate replication of the Okipa ceremony. In respect to the Mandan people, the "O-Kee-Pa" name is no longer used to reference this position.

Coma
A coma suspension is a suspension in which the hooks are placed in the chest, torso and legs, usually in two rows, such that the suspendee is lying face up. The name of this position comes from the similar imagery in the movie Coma.

Knee 
This suspension takes place hooked from the knees and hung vertically with the head closest to the ground and the knees at the top. There is no standard for hook placement on this suspension, as it depends almost solely on the anatomy of the suspendee. Some people refer to this as a "Falkner" suspension since Allen Falkner is the first known person to ever attempt this particular configuration. This style is relatively new, but is quickly growing in popularity. It is not considered to be an extremely painful suspension, but the drawbacks include lower back pain and ripping of skin in the areas around the knees. Another factor of this suspension is the increased blood pressure to the brain due to the inverted position, which can lead to disorientation and cause headaches.

Suicide
A suicide suspension is a suspension in which the hook(s) are placed in the upper back, such that the suspendee is hanging upright. This type of suspension is named suicide due to its similarity in appearance to someone who has hanged themselves.

Resurrection
A resurrection suspension is a suspension in which the suspended person is held up by hooks, usually in two rows on the belly; it gives the impression of rising from death as the suspendee is curved backwards facing up.

Crucifix

A crucifix suspension is a variation on a suicide suspension in which hooks are also placed in the arms, such that the suspendee appears to be hanging on a cross, with his or her arms held out to the side.

Superman
A superman suspension is the inverse of a coma suspension - the hooks are placed in the back and legs, usually in two rows, such that the suspendee is lying face down. This type of suspension is named superman due to the similarity in appearance to Superman flying.

Other
Other variations exist, using any number from one to dozens of hooks. The rebirth suspension is usually performed with 4 to 6 hooks in the back, with the suspendee in the fetal position, face down. 
Some hang from calves, ankles, knees, or buttocks. This can even include facial suspension. The "Angel" Suspension is six or eight hooks in the back where the outline of an angel's wings would be.

See also
 Body modification
 Fakir Musafar
 Modern primitive
 Play piercing

References

Further reading

External links 

 Suspension.org
 Body suspension videos from Ritual Flesh Suspension Team
 Gallery of marionette suspension pictures
 Suspension pictures
 BME Encyclopedia: Suspension 
 An elaborate 27 hook, 18 transition suspension by Miss Crash
 An informal suspension community in St. Petersburg, Russia
 Body suspension art installation videos from The Skin Project 

Body modification